The 2011 NAIA Division II Men’s Basketball national championship was held in March at Keeter Gymnasium in Point Lookout, Missouri.  The 20th annual NAIA basketball tournament featured 32 teams playing in a single-elimination format.

Awards and honors

Leading scorer:
Leading rebounder:

Bracket

  * denotes overtime.

See also
2011 NAIA Division I men's basketball tournament
2011 NCAA Division I men's basketball tournament
2011 NCAA Division II men's basketball tournament
2011 NCAA Division III men's basketball tournament
2011 NAIA Division II women's basketball tournament

References

NAIA Men's Basketball Championship
Tournament
2011 in sports in Missouri